The Marystown Group is a Neoproterozoic stratigraphic group of predominantly volcanic sediments – subaerially deposited ash-flow tuffs from rhyolites and alkaline basalts (with some minor sedimentary strata – red to green siltstones to conglomerates – interleaved), with a central sandstone unit, cropping out in Newfoundland.

It is likely to be temporally equivalent (more or less) to the Love Cove Group, Connaigre Bay Group, Long Harbour Group and Rock Harbour Group.

Age 
More accurate/precise dates suggest that the formation is 580-570 Ma (younger than stated in the box above, which uses U-Pb dates).

References

Neoproterozoic Newfoundland and Labrador
Volcanic rocks
Volcanism of Newfoundland and Labrador